Niederhosenbach is an Ortsgemeinde – a municipality belonging to a Verbandsgemeinde, a kind of collective municipality – in the Birkenfeld district in Rhineland-Palatinate, Germany. It belongs to the Verbandsgemeinde Herrstein-Rhaunen, whose seat is in Herrstein.

Geography

Location
The municipality lies north of the river Nahe between Kirn and Herrstein. The municipal area is 43.4% wooded.

Neighbouring municipalities
Niederhosenbach's neighbours are Herrstein, Breitenthal, Wickenrodt, Sonnschied, Griebelschied and Bergen.

Constituent communities
Also belonging to Niederhosenbach are the outlying homesteads of “Auf dem Büchelchen”, “Heupenmühle” and “Zwischen den Seen”.

History

Vanished village
South of Niederhosenbach, on the Hosenbach's left bank before the “Allholz” woods and opposite the Etzelberg (mountain) once stood a village named Hitzelhosenbach. A plaque at the site recalls the now long-vanished village. Standing at the spot where the road from Niederhosenbach to Fischbach crosses the brook was the Etzelberger Mühle (mill), which burnt down in 1913.

Politics

Municipal council
The council is made up of 8 council members, who were elected by majority vote at the municipal election held on 7 June 2009, and the honorary mayor as chairman.

Mayor
Niederhosenbach's mayor is Markus Schnurr.

Coat of arms
The German blazon reads: 

The municipality's arms might in English heraldic language be described thus: Per bend sinister argent a bend wavy abased above which the letters N and H in bend, and chequy gules and argent issuant from base a mount of three sable.

The letters N and H on the dexter (armsbearer's right, viewer's left) side refer to the municipality's name, as does the wavy bend (slanted stripe; the ending —bach means “brook” in German), while the “chequy” field on the sinister (armsbearer's left, viewer's right) side is a reference to the village's former allegiance to the County of Sponheim, and the mount of three – a charge called a Dreiberg in German heraldry – stands for the Amt within the County of Sponheim in which Niederhosenbach lay, namely Herrstein (whose name literally means “Lordstone”). Niederhosenbach even today lies in a Verbandsgemeinde of that same name.

Culture and sightseeing

Buildings
The following are listed buildings or sites in Rhineland-Palatinate’s Directory of Cultural Monuments:
 Evangelical church, Kirchstraße 5 – Late Gothic quire, marked 1518; Gothic Revival nave, 1842-1844; essentially mediaeval tower (Romanesque?), belfry 1842; Stumm organ, 1896; bell, 1894 by Jakob Pfeiffer, Kaiserslautern
 Fischbachstraße 1 – house, Renaissance Revival, 1880s
 Hauptstraße 39 – Quereinhaus (a combination residential and commercial house divided for these two purposes down the middle, perpendicularly to the street), partly timber-frame (plastered), Baroque dwelling section marked 1786
 Talstraße 9 – scattered estate; house from earlier half of the 19th century, bakehouse, stables
 Bridge, east of the village – one-arch quarrystone bridge over a tributary to the Hosenbach

Economy and infrastructure

Transport
Running southeast of the municipality is Bundesstraße 41. Serving nearby Fischbach is a railway station on the Nahe Valley Railway (Bingen–Saarbrücken).

References

External links
Municipality’s official webpage 

Birkenfeld (district)